Cartoon Dump is an online comedy web series/video podcast created by Frank Conniff (formerly of Mystery Science Theater 3000) and animation historian Jerry Beck. A live version was making monthly performances at the Steve Allen Theater in Los Angeles, California through late 2018 and premiered in New York City in January 2008. The show is currently running on the first Mondays of each month at QED Astoria in Astoria, New York, and hosted by Conniff.

Story and format
Set in a garbage dump, the show is a parody of stereotypical children's TV programming. The host of the show, “Compost Brite” (Erica Doering), despite being constantly cheery, obviously suffers from depression as well as anorexia nervosa. Compost Brite starts each episode with the show’s theme song, a jolly tune played on a theatre organ (however, Compost Brite is seen playing a guitar). Each episode features slightly different lyrics. After this, Compost Brite usually has a brief satirical discussion with the viewers on topics such as nutrition, dry heaves or how mediocrity pays off in the end. Later, one of Compost Brite’s friends, usually “Moodsy the Clinically Depressed Owl” (Conniff) joins in to sing a song or plug some fictional product that is sponsoring the show. This leads into the bulk of each episode, an obscure cartoon from Jerry Beck’s archives.

Episodes
As of November 2020, there have been many episodes of Cartoon Dump. As the episodes have no official titles, they are shown here with the titles of their respective cartoons.

"Mighty Mister Titan"
"The Big World of Little Adam"
Bucky and Pepito: "The Vexin' Texan"
Captain Fathom: "Rustlers of the Sea Range" 
"The Adventures of Spunky and Tadpole"
"The Adventures of Sir Gee Whiz on the Other Side of the Moon"

References

Links

2007 web series debuts
Mystery Science Theater 3000
Video podcasts
American animated web series